In enzymology, a vanillate monooxygenase is an enzyme that catalyzes the chemical reaction

 + O2 + NADH + H+   + NAD+ + H2O + formaldehyde

The 4 substrates of this enzyme are vanillate, O2, NADH, and H+, whereas its 4 products are 3,4-dihydroxybenzoate, NAD+, H2O, and formaldehyde.

This enzyme belongs to the family of oxidoreductases, specifically those acting on paired donors, with O2 as oxidant and incorporation or reduction of oxygen. The oxygen incorporated need not be derived from O2 with NADH or NADPH as one donor, and incorporation of one atom o oxygen into the other donor.  The systematic name of this enzyme class is vanillate:oxygen oxidoreductase (demethylating). Other names in common use include 4-hydroxy-3-methoxybenzoate demethylase, and vanillate demethylase.  This enzyme participates in 2,4-dichlorobenzoate degradation.

References 

 
 

EC 1.14.13
NADPH-dependent enzymes
NADH-dependent enzymes
Enzymes of unknown structure